Lunan may refer to:

Geography

Europe 
Lunan, Angus, a hamlet in Angus, Scotland
Lunan, Lot, a commune in the Lot department in south-western France
Lunan Water, a river in Angus, Scotland
Lunan Burn, a river that flows into Loch of Butterstone

China 
Lunan District (路南区), in Tangshan, Hebei
Lunan, Yingkou (路南镇), town in Laobian District, Yingkou, Liaoning
Lunan Subdistrict, Qinhuangdao (路南街道), in Shanhaiguan District, Qinhuangdao, Hebei
Lunan Subdistrict (路南街道), a township-level division of Lianyungang, Jiangsu
Lunan Subdistrict, Taizhou, Zhejiang (路南街道), in Luqiao District, Taizhou, Zhejiang

People 
David Lunan, Church of Scotland minister
Duncan Lunan, Scottish astronomer and science writer
Daniel Lunan, English semi-professional footballer
Gordon Lunan, Canadian spy for the Soviet Union